Kevin Kent Relato Racal (born May 16, 1991) is a Filipino professional basketball player who plays for the Converge FiberXers of the PBA.

College career
Racal first studied at the Pamantasan ng Lungsod ng Muntinlupa and suited up for the PLMun Marshalls in the UCLAA. In 2010, he led the Muntinlupa cagers to win the inaugural Coca-Cola Hoopla title by scoring 41 points and was awarded MVP of the tournament. His stint at the Coca-Cola Hoopla was a way for him to be discovered and subsequently recruited to continue his studies at Colegio de San Juan de Letran and play for the Letran Knights. In his rookie season in 2011, he was a noted slasher, averaging 6.8 points per game. He is also a rugged, hard-nosed defender, as shown during their Final Four match against San Sebastian and the finals series against San Beda in 2012. Upon the graduation of Kevin Alas, he and playmaker Mark Cruz took over the scoring reins for the team and powered the Knights to a finals rematch against the Red Lions in 2013 but still came up short. On September 23, 2014, he suffered an ACL injury and was ruled out for the rest of the season while his team was eliminated from the Final Four contention. He has since returned to action for the 91st season as the Knights are in the hunt for the title in his last playing year. In that same year, his team, the Letran Knights, successfully dethroned the San Beda Red Lions to win the NCAA Championship, which Letran last won since 2005. In lieu of this, he won the Pivotal Player of the Year award together with FEU's Roger Pogoy in the 2016 Collegiate Basketball Awards organized by UAAP-NCAA Press Corps.

Professional career
On August 23, 2015, Racal was drafted 11th overall by the Alaska Aces in the 2015 PBA draft. On October 30, 2015, a day after he won a championship for Letran, he signed a two-year multi-million contract to play for the Aces.

On April 27, 2022, Racal signed a one-year deal with the Converge FiberXers, the new team that took over the defunct Alaska Aces franchise.

PBA career statistics

As of the end of 2022–23 season

Season-by-season averages

|-
| align=left | 
| align=left | Alaska
| 26 || 17.9 || .462 || .324 || .692 || 1.7 || .9 || .4 || .1 || 3.9
|-
| align=left | 
| align=left | Alaska
| 35 || 26.1 || .352 || .292 || .750 || 3.0 || 1.3 || .7 || .3 || 5.7
|-
| align=left | 
| align=left | Alaska
| 51 || 23.6 || .401 || .370 || .735 || 3.0 || 1.6 || .9 || .1 || 5.8
|-
| align=left | 
| align=left | Alaska
| 25 || 21.4 || .443 || .412 || .815 || 2.6 || 1.3 || .8 || .3 || 4.8
|-
| align=left | 
| align=left | Alaska
| 1 || 13.3 || .750 || 1.000 || – || 2.0 || 1.0 || 1.0 || .0 || 8.0
|-
| align=left | 
| align=left | Alaska
| 13 || 13.0 || .400 || .333 || .000 || 1.0 || .8 || .5 || .1 || 2.3
|-
| align=left | 
| align=left | Converge
| 35 || 17.0 || .351 || .321 || .920 || 1.9 || .9 || .5 || .2 || 4.1
|-class=sortbottom
| colspan="2" align="center" | Career
| 186 || 21.0 || .394 || .346 || .759 || 2.4 || 1.2 || .7 || .2 || 4.8

References

1991 births
Living people
Alaska Aces (PBA) players
Basketball players from Metro Manila
Filipino men's basketball players
Letran Knights basketball players
People from Mandaluyong
Small forwards
Alaska Aces (PBA) draft picks
Converge FiberXers players